Aaron Fox (born May 19, 1976) is an American ice hockey executive and former professional ice hockey player.

Early life 
Fox was born in Hastings, Minnesota. He attended Minnesota State University, Mankato from 1996 to 2000. During his senior year, he was the team captain of the Minnesota State Mavericks men's ice hockey team.

Career 
Except for short stints with the Milwaukee Admirals of the International Hockey League, and the Peoria Rivermen and Richmond Renegades of the East Coast Hockey League, he spent his professional career abroad, playing in Slovakia, Switzerland, Germany, Austria, Slovenia and Croatia.

While playing for the Vienna Capitals, he led the Austrian Hockey League in scoring in 2007–08. He also displayed his scoring ability at Austrian second-division side EC Dornbirn in 2010–11, when he tallied a league-leading 83 points (30 goals, 53 assists) in 42 games.

Managing career 
In 2013, Fox decided to end to his playing career and signed a three-year deal as sports director of KHL Medveščak Zagreb. The Zagreb team left the KHL at the conclusion of the 2016–17 season to join the Austrian ICE Hockey League.
On July 30, 2018, Medveščak announced that Fox would serve as both sports director and coach. Less than nine months later, on April 16, 2019, the Sheffield Steelers of the Elite Ice Hockey League announced Fox as the team's new coach and general manager, having signed him to a three-year contract.

References

External links 
 

Ice hockey people from Minnesota
People from Hastings, Minnesota
1976 births
Vienna Capitals players
KHL Medveščak Zagreb players
Straubing Tigers players
Living people
American men's ice hockey centers
American ice hockey coaches
Green Bay Gamblers players
Minnesota State Mavericks men's ice hockey players
Peoria Rivermen (ECHL) players
Milwaukee Admirals (IHL) players
Richmond Renegades players
Ice hockey players from Minnesota

Minnesota State University, Mankato alumni